From Elvis Presley Boulevard, Memphis, Tennessee is the twenty-third studio album by American singer and musician Elvis Presley, released by RCA Records in May, 1976. It became Presley's fourth album to reach #1 on the Billboard country music album sales chart within the last four years.

"Hurt" was a top 10 hit on both the country and adult contemporary charts, while "For the Heart" stalled at #45 on the country charts.  The latter did make the pop top 30.  Both songs would again find success on the country charts in the '80s – "For the Heart" became the first single for The Judds in 1983, while Juice Newton took her version of "Hurt" to #1 in 1986.

From Elvis Presley Boulevard, Memphis, Tennessee was certified Gold on October 10, 1977 by the RIAA.

Content
It is often assumed that From Elvis Presley Boulevard, Memphis, Tennessee is a concert recording as the album states the songs were "recorded live". While this is true, the songs were recorded live in the recording studio set up in Presley's mansion, Graceland, not in front of an audience.  Two songs recorded during the session, "Moody Blue" and "She Thinks I Still Care" would be released the following year on his final album, Moody Blue.

Reissues
In 2000 the album's tracks were added to Moody Blue to create an expanded 19-track CD of the latter title. In 2000 a two-disc edition of From Elvis Presley Boulevard, Memphis, Tennessee was issued on the "Follow That Dream" label.

Track listing

Original LP release
All songs recorded at Graceland, Memphis.

2000 CD re-issue

2012 Follow That Dream CD edition

Personnel
Elvis Presley – lead vocals
J.D. Sumner & The Stamps – background vocals 
Kathy Westmoreland – background vocals 
 Myrna Smith – background vocals 
James Burton – lead guitar except “Blue Eyes Crying in the Rain”
John Wilkinson – electric rhythm guitar 
Charlie Hodge – acoustic rhythm guitar
Jerry Scheff – bass guitar except “Blue Eyes Crying in the Rain”
 Glen D. Hardin – piano except "Blue Eyes Crying in the Rain"
David Briggs – Fender Rhodes electric piano; piano on "Blue Eyes Crying in the Rain" 
Ron Tutt – drums
Billy Sanford — lead guitar on "Blue Eyes Crying in the Rain"
Norbert Putnam — bass guitar on "Blue Eyes Crying in the Rain"
 Bobby Emmons — Fender Rhodes electric piano on "Blue Eyes Crying in the Rain"
Bergen White – string and horn arrangements

Overdubbed
 Chip Young – guitar
 Shane Keister – Moog synthesizer
 Dennis Linde — bass
 Dolores Edgin — backing vocals
 Hurschel Wiginton — backing vocals
 Wendellyn Suits – backing vocals
 Sherrill Nielsen — backing vocals
 Farrell Morris – congas, timpani
 uncredited musicians – strings

Technical
Al Pachucki, Brian Christian, Ron Olson, Tom Brown, Tom Pick – engineer
Larry Schnapf – director of engineering
Roy Shockley – technician

Charts

Weekly charts

Year-end charts

Certifications

References

External links

1976 albums
Elvis Presley albums
Albums produced by Felton Jarvis
Albums recorded in a home studio
RCA Records albums